SMS Undine was the last member of the ten-ship  of light cruisers that were built for the German Kaiserliche Marine (Imperial Navy) in the late 1890s and early 1900s. The Gazelle class was the culmination of earlier unprotected cruiser and aviso designs, combining the best aspects of both types in what became the progenitor of all future light cruisers of the Imperial fleet. Undine was a modified version of the basic Gazelle design, with improved armor and additional coal storage for a longer cruising range.

Undine was initially used as an artillery training ship for the gunners of the German fleet. She also took part in training maneuvers with other elements of the fleet, and during one of these exercises in November 1905, she accidentally rammed and sank the torpedo boat . The ship remained in German waters, making only a single visit to a foreign port in 1909. Undine remained in service through mid-1912. During this period, in addition to her training duties, she served as an auxiliary icebreaker.

After the outbreak of World War I in August 1914, Undine was deployed to the Baltic Sea, serving in the Coastal Defense Division. She was tasked with patrolling the western Baltic and she also participated in offensive operations against Russian forces. She was attacked by the British submarine  on 7 November 1915 and was hit by two torpedoes, the second of which detonated the ship's ammunition magazines. Undine exploded and sank, but casualties were relatively light, with fourteen or twenty-five killed in the sinking out of a normal crew of 270.

Design

The designers had to design a small cruiser with armor protection that had an optimal combination of speed, armament, and stability necessary for fleet operations, along with the endurance to operate on foreign stations in the German colonial empire. The resulting Gazelle design provided the basis for all of the light cruisers built by the German fleet to the last official designs prepared in 1914.

Her propulsion system consisted of two triple-expansion steam engines manufactured by Howaldtswerke driving a pair of screw propellers. The engines were powered by eight coal-fired Marine-type water-tube boilers. She had a crew of 14 officers and 256 enlisted men.

The ship was armed with ten  SK L/40 guns in single mounts. Two were placed side by side forward on the forecastle, six were located amidships, three on either side, and two were placed side by side aft. They were supplied with 1,500 rounds of ammunition, for 150 shells per gun. She was also equipped with two  torpedo tubes with five torpedoes. They were submerged in the hull on the broadside.

Service history

Construction – 1905

Undine was ordered under the contract name "J" and was laid down at the Howaldtswerke shipyard in Kiel on 28 September 1901. She was launched on 11 December 1902, and during the ceremony, Prince Otto zu Salm-Horstmar, the president of the Flottenverein (Navy League), gave a speech. After her launching, fitting-out work commenced, and she was commissioned to begin sea trials on 5 January 1904 under the command of Korvettenkapitän (KK—Corvette Captain) Carl Schaumann. During the trials, she conducted tests with gyrocompasses that were not successful owing to their sensitivity to even moderate swells. After completing her testing on 23 March, she was transferred to Wilhelmshaven and decommissioned there on 30 March. She was recommissioned on 10 January 1905 and was assigned to the training squadron for use as a gunnery training ship to modernize the vessels that were available to train the fleet's gunners; the vessel she replaced was the old screw corvette , which had been launched in 1880. During this period, from 10 January to September, KK Georg Scheidt served as the ship's commander.

Undine underwent another round of trials, which ended when she moved back to Kiel on 4 February. She took part in training exercises from 7 to 19 May held off Alsen, along with other vessels in the training ships assigned to the Inspektion der Schiffsartillerie (Naval Artillery Inspectorate), under the command of Konteradmiral (Rear Admiral) Hugo Zeye. These were followed by further maneuvers held off Rügen. From 1 to 7 August, she cruised with her sister ship  and several old torpedo boats filled with cork for use as torpedo targets. They also conducted simulated nighttime attacks on Undine to practice defending against them, as the Imperial Japanese Navy had recently demonstrated the effectiveness of such attacks during the Russo-Japanese War. Throughout the year, she took part in the normal peacetime routine of training exercises, which included shooting practice in the waters off Helgoland from 8 to 12 October. KK Berthold Stechow relieved Scheidt in September that year.

She also took part in another round of nighttime torpedo boat exercises with IV Torpedo-boat Flotilla in November. The cruiser was steaming with her lights off, and when the torpedo boats approached to conduct a mock torpedo attack, Undine turned her search lights on, which blinded the crew of S126. The torpedo boat inadvertently ran in front of Undine, and the latter rammed the former, slicing her in half. The torpedo boat  collided with the still-floating stern. Both halves of the ship sank quickly and one officer and thirty-two enlisted men drowned in the accident. S126s wreck was later raised, reassembled, and returned to service.

1906–1914
From 3 May to 9 June 1906, the ship underwent repairs to her bow as a result of the damage incurred in the collision with S126; the work was performed at the Kaiserliche Werft (Imperial Shipyard) in Wilhelmshaven. She spent the rest of the year conducting training exercises. The year 1907 passed uneventfully, with the only events of note being an overhaul in Wilhelmshaven from 10 to 27 February, and during the annual fleet maneuvers from 25 September to 8 September, she operated with III Squadron. Undine underwent another overhaul from 29 January to 27 March 1908. She was transferred on 1 July to Sonderburg, where the new gunnery school had been opened. In April 1909, KK Ulrich Lübbert took command of the ship. She took part in training exercises in the North Sea in July before returning to Sonderburg by way of the Skagerrak, thereafter visiting Larvik, Norway; this was the only time Undine visited a foreign port. She was assigned to III Scouting Group during that year's fleet exercises, which were held from 29 August to 11 September.

In May 1910, while Undine was steaming off Sonderburg, she encountered the steamship , which had suffered an engine breakdown. The cruiser took the vessel under tow and pulled her to Kiel. By late in the year, Undine was becoming worn out, which necessitated a major overhaul at the Kaiserliche Werft in Danzig that lasted from 26 September to 17 October. During this period, KK Victor Reclam replaced Lübbert. She took part in a naval review of the High Seas Fleet held for Kaiser Wilhelm II on 5 September. The ship was used as an auxiliary icebreaker in January and February 1912, rescuing three ships that were trapped in the ice in the western Baltic. Undine was assigned to the Training Squadron in April before being decommissioned in Danzig on 12 July for another major overhaul; during this last stint in service, her commander was Fregattenkapitän (Frigate Captain) Andreas Fischer. Following its completion, she was placed in reserve, where she remained through mid-1914.

World War I
After the outbreak of World War I in July 1914, Undine was recommissioned on 4 August and assigned to the Coastal Defense Division in the western Baltic. She initially patrolled the line between Dornbusch and Møn, and was briefly assigned to the Detached Division under KAdm Ehler Behring. She took part in a sortie into the Gulf of Finland that occurred from 3 to 9 September under the direction of Prince Heinrich of Prussia, the supreme commander of naval forces in the Baltic. While on the operation on 8 September, Undine suffered a machinery breakdown that forced her to return to Danzig and then Kiel for repairs. Twenty-two of her crew were sent aboard the torpedo boat  on 14–15 September to reinforce the landing party that had been sent ashore from the cruiser  at Memel, but they were unable to land. Undine was ready for service again on 18 October, thereafter patrolling the area between Trelleborg, Sweden, and Sassnitz, Germany. Over the following months, she served intermittently as the flagship of Vizeadmiral (Vice Admiral) Robert Mischke, the commander of the Coastal Defense Division. Undine was transferred back to the Detached Division on 13 April 1915 to take part in an operation the next day to bombard Russian positions at Memel and Buddendiekshof; the attacks continued through 17 April, after which Undine returned to the Coastal Defense Division.

On 7 November 1915, Undine was steaming north of Arkona with a pair of torpedo boats as escort for the ferry Preussen as it moved from Trelleborg to Sassnitz. She was attacked by the British submarine , under the command of Lieutenant Commander Francis Cromie. The second torpedo detonated her ammunition magazines and blew up the ship. Undine broke in half and sank quickly at 13:08; the bow portion sank immediately but the stern section remained afloat briefly, jutting out of the water at a steep angle. Casualties were relatively minor, but the number is unclear: according to Erich Gröner, fourteen men were killed, but Hans Hildebrand, Albert Röhr, and Hans-Otto Steinmetz report that twenty-five died. The majority of her crew was rescued by the torpedo boat  and Preussen. Most of those who died were killed when the forward funnel and mast collapsed and fell over, crushing the men in the water. The loss of Undine came on the heels of the sinking of the armored cruiser  two weeks earlier. These two losses were significant enough to compel the German Navy to curtail the movements of the fleet in the Baltic for the remainder of the year.

Notes

Footnotes

Citations

References

Further reading
 

Gazelle-class cruisers
Ships built in Kiel
1902 ships
World War I cruisers of Germany
Ships sunk by British submarines
World War I shipwrecks in the Baltic Sea
Maritime incidents in 1905
Maritime incidents in 1915
Naval magazine explosions